Sara Francis-Bayman (  Bayman, born 23 December 1984) is a former netball player and coach from Billinge near Wigan, England.
She represented England in the 2010 Commonwealth Games.
At a club level, Bayman has represented Team Bath, Manchester Thunder and UWS Sirens in the Netball Superleague, and Central Pulse in the ANZ Premiership.
She will be acting as Director of Netball of Loughborough Lightning for the 2019 Superleague season.

On 24 December 2018, Sara proposed to her long term partner and ex-England Roses team mate Stacey Francis.

References 

1984 births
Alumni of the University of Bath
Sportspeople from Wigan
English netball players
Netball Superleague players
ANZ Championship players
Team Bath netball players
Commonwealth Games bronze medallists for England
Netball players at the 2010 Commonwealth Games
Netball players at the 2014 Commonwealth Games
Commonwealth Games medallists in netball
Living people
Netball Superleague coaches
English netball coaches
Manchester Thunder players
Sirens Netball players
AENA Super Cup players
LGBT netball players
Loughborough Lightning (netball) coaches
ANZ Premiership players
2015 Netball World Cup players
Central Pulse players
English LGBT sportspeople
English expatriate netball people in New Zealand
Medallists at the 2010 Commonwealth Games